Cadamuro is an Italian surname. Notable people with the surname include:
Liassine Cadamuro (born 1988), French footballer
Louisa Cadamuro (born 1987), French footballer, wife of Liassine
Simone Cadamuro (born 1976), Italian road racing cyclist

Italian-language surnames